The Sydney Convention & Exhibition Centre was a convention, exhibition and entertainment complex in Darling Harbour, Sydney. Designed by Philip Cox, the complex opened in 1988 as part of an urban renewal and redevelopment of the Darling Harbour area during the period. The complex was eventually demolished in 2013 to make way for the International Convention Centre.

History
Built by Leighton Contractors, the Sydney Convention & Exhibition Centre (SC&EC) opened in 1988, with a new section of the centre added for the 2000 Summer Olympics. During those games, the venue played host to the boxing, fencing, judo, weightlifting, and wrestling competitions. The building was owned by the Government of New South Wales, with the centre administration and business run initially by a company Called Arena Meetings Conventions and Exhibitions, which at the time also operated the Sydney Entertainment centre since the date of its opening. They were awarded the contract to commission and operate the site for the first 5 years of its operations. The Accor Hotel Group subsequently gained the second 5-year term on a competitive bid basis. The SC&EC was used as a conference and convention venue and to hold exhibitions, as well as hosting various smaller events such as weddings and meetings. The Convention Centre had around 30 rooms, ranging from small meeting rooms to a 3,500 capacity auditorium, as well as foyer areas and other spaces which can be adapted for use as an exhibition space or pre-dinner function venue. The Exhibition Centre consisted of initially five primary halls, and was subsequently expanded to 6 and was used primarily for exhibitions, but also for gala dinners and other large-scale events.

The SC&EC was used as the biggest building venue for the Sydney Olympic Games outside of Sydney Olympic Park.The SC&EC was a key meeting venue of APEC Australia 2007 in September, 2007 when the political leaders of the 21 member states of the Asia-Pacific Economic Cooperation met. The venue was host to the Business Leader's Summit held in conjunction with APEC Leader's Week. In 2013 it was demolished to make way for the International Convention Centre Sydney.

Architecture award
The 1989 Australian Institute of Architects Sir John Sulman Medal for Public Architecture was jointly awarded to Philip Cox Richardson Taylor Partners for the SC&EC. The design team was also presented with the 2007 Excellence in Construction Award by the Master Builders Association; were finalists in the 1988 World Quaternario Award; and received a Commendation in Building and Civil Design at the 1988 National Engineering Excellence Awards.

Criticism of demolition
Architects John Andrews and Philip Cox spoke out over the demolition of the convention and exhibition buildings completed in 1988, blasting the demolition plans as "rather stupid".

Transport
The Sydney Monorail and Inner West Light Rail provided public transport to the centre. The monorail opened in 1988 and shut down in 2013. The light rail opened in 1997. The Convention and Exhibition Centre stations are named after the SC&EC.

References

External links

Sydney Convention and Exhibition Centre

Badminton venues
Badminton in Australia
Boxing venues in Australia
Buildings and structures awarded the Sir John Sulman Medal
Buildings and structures demolished in 2014
Buildings and structures in Sydney
Commercial buildings completed in 1988
Convention centres in Australia
Event venues established in 1988
Olympic boxing venues
Olympic fencing venues
Olympic International Broadcast Centres
Olympic judo venues
Olympic weightlifting venues
Olympic wrestling venues
Philip Cox buildings
Venues of the 2000 Summer Olympics
1988 establishments in Australia
2013 disestablishments in Australia